The 2021–22 Leicester City W.F.C. season was the club's 18th season and their first in history as a top-flight team following promotion to the FA Women's Super League, the highest level of the women's football pyramid, at the end of the previous season. Outside of the league, the club also contested two domestic cup competitions: the FA Cup and the League Cup.

On 25 August 2021, the club announced the women's team would be moving to the King Power Stadium with Burton Albion's Pirelli Stadium serving as backup when fixtures clash with Leicester's men's team.

On 25 November 2021, Jonathan Morgan was relieved of his managerial duties having lost all eight league games to start the season. It ended a seven year spell in which he guided the team from the fourth-tier FA Women's Midlands Division One to the FA WSL. Head of women's football development, Emile Heskey, was named caretaker on the same day. Heskey managed one game, against Manchester United in the League Cup, before England women's under-17 head coach Lydia Bedford took over permanently on 6 December 2021.

Squad

Preseason

FA Women's Super League

Results summary

Results by matchday

Results

League table

Women's FA Cup 

As a member of the first tier, Leicester City entered the FA Cup in the fourth round proper.

FA Women's League Cup

Group stage

Squad statistics

Appearances 

Starting appearances are listed first, followed by substitute appearances after the + symbol where applicable.

|-
|colspan="12"|Players away from the club on loan:

|}

Transfers

Transfers in

Loans in

Transfers out

Loans out

References 

Leicester City W.F.C.